Lewis and Clark State Park may refer to the following:
Lewis and Clark State Park (Iowa)
Lewis and Clark State Park (Missouri)
Lewis and Clark State Park (North Dakota)
Lewis and Clark State Park (Oregon)
Lewis and Clark State Park (Washington)
Lewis and Clark Trail State Park in Washington
Lewis and Clark National and State Historical Parks in Oregon and Washington